Laurent Vidal (18 February 1984 – 10 November 2015) was a French professional triathlete, three time French Champion (2009, 2011 and 2012) and two time Olympian. In Beijing 2008 he placed 36th while he took the 5th place in London 2012.

Vidal was one of the most consistent performers in the International Triathlon Union Circuit, consistently improving years after years. Laurent Vidal spent his life between Sète, France and Christchurch, New Zealand, the hometown of his fiancée Andrea Hewitt.  Vidal had a bachelor's degree in Sports Management.

Sports career and Death 

At his ITU debut in Hungary, Vidal became European Vice Champion (Junior), and one year later in 2003 he placed fourth at the World Championships (Junior) in New Zealand. In 2008, he represented France at the Olympic Games (36th), in 2010 he won the Oceania Championships, and in 2011 he placed 7th at both European and World Championships.

In 2012, he started the year winning the Geelong (Australia) Oceania Cup and the opening round of World Cup Circuit in Mooloolaba ( Australia), followed by a bronze medal at the first World Championship event in Sydney (Australia). In June 2012, he became leader of the ITU Point List for the first time of his career.

In London Olympic Games he crossed the line in 5th position.

He finished 2012 with a win the prestigious GARMIN Alpen-Triathlon in Schliersee, a 3rd national title and placed 7th at world champs.
 
After a long post Olympic break, Vidal finished 2013 ranked number 7 in the World Triathlon Series ranking, his 4th top 8th since 2009 in this ranking.

In 2013 he also won the Kinloch (NZL) Oceania Cup, the  GARMIN Alpen-Triathlon in Schliersee repeating his 2012 performance.

In France, Vidal took part in the prestigious French Club Championship Series and, represented TC Lievin.

In Germany, Vidal was among the international guest stars of EJOT Team Buschhütten, which he represented in the Bundesliga.

Vidal was a member (caporal) of the French Military Triathlon Team (Equipe de France), whose basis is the Ecoles militaires de Draguignan (EMD).

In April 2014 Vidal suffered a cardiopulmonary arrest whilst swimming in Sète, which led to his being placed in an induced coma. As a result, he was forced to retire from competition and focus on his role coaching Hewitt. On 10 November 2015, Vidal died at the age of 31 after cardiac arrest at his home in Gigean, Hérault, France.

ITU competitions 
In the nine years from 2002 to 2010, Vidal took part in 53 ITU competitions and achieved 25 top ten positions.

The following list is based upon the official ITU rankings and the ITU Athletes's Profile Page.
Unless indicated otherwise, the following events are triathlons (Olympic Distance) and refer to the Elite category.

DNS = did not start · DNF = did not finish · BG = the sponsor British Gas

Notes

External links 
 Vidal's Official Website in French and English
 French Triathlon Federation in French
 Laurent Vidal's exclusive sports news in French

People from Sète
1984 births
2015 deaths
French male triathletes
Triathletes at the 2008 Summer Olympics
Triathletes at the 2012 Summer Olympics
Olympic triathletes of France
Sportspeople from Hérault
20th-century French people
21st-century French people